Dr. Joseph Tonzetich (deceased) is considered the modern-day pioneer in bad breath research. During the 1960s and 1970s in particular, Tonzetich and colleagues established that volatile sulfur-containing compounds were key identifiable gases in oral malodor. He also provided quantitative support for the hypothesis proposed by G.L.Grapp in the early 1930s that the back of the tongue is the major source of oral malodor.

Tonzetich was a professor (1968–1990) in the Faculty of Dentistry, University of British Columbia, and donated more than $300,000 to establish a fellowship endowment fund at the university. He helped organize international meetings on the subject of diagnosis and treatment of bad breath, was a founding member of the International Society for Breath Odor Research, lectured internationally, and trained a cadre of international experts on this subject.

External links
The Joseph Tonzetich Fellowship
The UBC Faculty of Dentistry

Year of birth missing
Year of death missing
Cornell University alumni
Academic staff of the University of British Columbia